The flag for the city of Denison, Texas, was designed in 1873, and formally approved on November 13, 1968. It composed of a bicolor of green and white separated by a red stripe, with a black vertical stripe and white star at the center.

Symbolism 
The meanings of each of the colors and the star are as follows:
The green band represents the green grass of Indian Territory (now Oklahoma, located only a few miles to the north).
The red band represents the nearby Red River.
The white band represents Texas cotton fields.
The black vertical stripe bisecting the bands represents the Missouri-Kansas-Texas Railroad (better known as the M-K-T or Katy Railroad, which is now part of the Union Pacific Railroad).
The star in the middle represents Denison.

 Flag
Flags of cities in Texas
Flags introduced in 1968
1968 establishments in Texas